Dryhope is a village in the Scottish Borders area of Scotland, by St. Mary's Loch, on the A708. Known for its rolling green hills and ample walking paths. Also home of St Mary's Loch, the largest natural loch in the Scottish Borders.

See also
Dryhope Tower
List of places in the Scottish Borders
List of places in Scotland

External links
RCAHMS record for Dryhope Burn
RCAHMS/Canmore: record for Dryhope hut circle
Gazetteer for Scotland: Dryhope
GEOGRAPH image: Kirkstead Burn from Dryhope
GEOGRAPH image: Dryhope Rig
Walking route around St. Mary's Loch from Dryhope

Villages in the Scottish Borders